Matrilin-3 is a matrilin protein that in humans is encoded by the MATN3 gene.

References

External links
  GeneReviews/NCBI/NIH/UW entry on Multiple Epiphyseal Dysplasia, Dominant

Further reading

Extracellular matrix proteins